Kisielewski (feminine: Kisielewska) is a Polish surname and can refer to:

 Jan August Kisielewski (1876–1918), a Polish writer, brother of Zygmunt Kisielewski
Jacek Junosza Kisielewski (born 1952), a Polish biologist and diplomat
 Józef Kisielewski (1905–1966), a Polish writer, journalist and politician
 Stefan Kisielewski (1911–1991), a Polish writer, publicist, composer and politician
 Wacław Kisielewski (1943–1986), a Polish pianist, son of Stefan Kisielewski
 Zygmunt Kisielewski (1882–1942), a Polish writer, brother of Jan August and father of Stefan

See also
 
 Kisiel (Polish surname)
 Kysel, Kyselák (Czech surnames)

Polish-language surnames